Ghana competed at the 2022 Winter Olympics in Beijing, China. The 2022 Winter Olympics were held from 4 to 20 February 2022.

Ghana's team consisted of one male alpine skier, marking the country's return to the sport for the first time since 2010. Alpine skier Carlos Mäder was also the country's flagbearer during the opening ceremony. Meanwhile a volunteer was the flagbearer during the closing ceremony.

Competitors
The following is the list of number of competitors at the Games per sport/discipline.

Alpine skiing

Carlos Mäder met the basic qualification standards meaning that Ghana  qualified one male alpine skier. Mäder was born in Ghana, but was adopted by Swiss parents and has resided in Switzerland for most of his life. Mäder was the oldest alpine skier at the games, and did not finish his only event, the men's giant slalom.

See also
Tropical nations at the Winter Olympics
Ghana at the 2022 Commonwealth Games

References

External links
Beijing 2022 – Ghana 

Nations at the 2022 Winter Olympics
2022
Winter Olympics